Charles Bruce Flick (17 August 1933 – 26 October 2021) was an Australian basketball player. He competed in the men's tournament at the 1956 Summer Olympics.

References

External links
 

1933 births
2021 deaths
Australian men's basketball players
Olympic basketball players of Australia
Basketball players at the 1956 Summer Olympics